State Route 155 (SR 155), mostly designated as Briley Parkway, is a major freeway and parkway beltway around Nashville, Tennessee.

Briley Parkway, named in honor of former Nashville mayor Beverly Briley, passes the Grand Ole Opry House, Opry Mills, and the Opryland Hotel east of Nashville. It crosses the Cumberland River twice, once near Madison, and again on the west side of Nashville, near the Riverbend Maximum Security Institution and John C. Tune Airport. On the southeast portion of the loop, Briley Parkway crosses Interstate 40 and passes Nashville International Airport.

Route description

Briley Parkway

Briley Parkway consists of the northern loop of SR 155 from I-40 on the west side of Nashville to I-24 southeast of downtown Nashville, which makes up about two thirds of the length of the highway. The entirety of Briley Parkway is a controlled access highway, except for the  segment between I-24 and I-40, including the interchange with US 41/70S (Murfreesboro Pike), which is limited access. Between I-40 near the Nashville International Airport and Ellington Parkway (US 31 E), Briley Parkway is four lanes each way. The rest of the parkway is two lanes each way. 

Briley Parkway begins at a full Y interchange with I-40 in west Nashville (although the route continues to the south), and runs north at this point along the northwestern urban boundary of the city of Nashville. The first interchange is with Centennial Boulevard, which connects to Cockrill Bend Boulevard near the Riverbend Maximum Security Institution. The parkway then crosses the Cumberland River on the Andrew B. Gibson Bridge, and has an interchange with County Hospital Road near the University School of Nashville. About  later is an interchange with SR 12 (Ashland City Highway). Here the parkway curves sharply to the northeast, running mostly east to west beyond this point. The next interchange, about  later, is with US 41 Alternate (Clarksville Pike) near the neighborhood of Haynes Estates. About  later is an interchange with US 431 (Whites Creek Pike). About  later, Briley Parkway interchanges with I-24 in a cloverleaf interchange. About  beyond that is the next interchange, which is with Brick Church Pike. Beyond this point, Briley Parkway continues for another mile, and has a complicated interchange with US 31W/41 (Dickerson Pike) and I-65, then US 31E southbound (Ellington Parkway) less than  later. At these interchanges, US 31W/41 (Dickerson Pike) and I-65 southbound are accessible together from both directions. From the westbound lanes, I-65 northbound and US 31E southbound (Ellington Parkway) are accessible together. From the eastbound lanes, I-65 northbound and US 31E southbound (Ellington Parkway) are accessible independently. 

At this point, Briley Parkway widens to eight lanes, and begins a brief concurrency with US 31E, which splits off northbound as Gallatin Pike at an interchange  later. The highway then crosses the Cumberland River again and curves sharply to the southeast. Here the parkway reaches an interchange with McGavock Pike, which is a connector road to the Gaylord Opryland Resort & Convention Center, Music Valley, and the site of the Grand Ole Opry. Entering a short straightaway, Briley Parkway runs almost directly north-south at this point. Less than  later, Briley Parkway has a trumpet interchange with a connector road to Opry Mills Mall. The next interchange, about  later, is an interchange with Two Rivers Parkway. The parkway then shifts slightly to the west, before curving sharply to the east, and then to the west again, in somewhat of a "c-shaped" curve. The parkway then reaches an interchange with US 70 (Lebanon Pike) just under  later. The route shifts slightly again, maintaining its general north-south direction. Then slightly over  later is the next interchange, which is with Elm Hill Pike. The parkway then curves to the southwest, and reaches a combination interchange with Interstate 40 near the Nashville International Airport. Here the route reduces to two lanes in each direction and the freeway segment ends. Continuing as a limited access highway, Briley Parkway has intersections with three major thoroughfares before reaching a trumpet interchange with Airways Boulevard, an exit to the former site of  Nashville's Berry Field airport. The route continues for another mile, next to an aircraft manufacturing site adjacent to the airport, before reaching an interchange with US 41/70S (Murfreesboro Pike). Running northeast–southwest, Briley Parkway continues for another  before reaching the interchange with I-24. This partial cloverleaf interchange also includes access to a restricted connector road Averitt Express Drive, the entrance to an Averitt Express freight hub. The limited access segment of Briley Parkway ends at this interchange. However the Briley Parkway designation does not end until an intersection about  later, where SR 155 becomes Thompson Lane.

White Bridge Road/Thompson Lane
The segment of SR 155 designated as White Bridge Road begins at the interchange with I-40 in west Nashville, where the route continues north as controlled-access Briley Parkway. This entire section of SR 155 is a four-lane major arterial thoroughfare with many intersections. Beyond this point, the route immediately has an intersection with US 70, and runs directly north-south before curving to the southeast over  later near Nashville State Community College. The route the crosses a railroad and intersects with US 70S (Harding Road). At this intersection, the route becomes two-lane Woodmont Boulevard, and the SR 155 designation ends, although many maps show this segment as being part of SR 155. About  later the road curves to the southeast, and begins running east-west nearly perfectly straight before reaching an intersection with US 431 (Hillsboro Pike). About  later, the route widens back to four lanes and has an interchange with US 31 (Franklin Road), where the route becomes Thompson Lane, and SR 155 begins again, this time with a secondary designation. The route then crosses I-65 and intersects with Powell Avenue, which contains signs directing drivers to I-65. Continuing east, SR 155 crosses a railyard and about  later intersects with US 31A/41A (Nolensville Pike). About  later, the route reaches an intersection where Thompson Lane splits off to the north and the route becomes Briley Parkway, and the interchange with I-24 is less than  beyond this point.

History

Briley Parkway was initially a city project, and construction began in 1961. The  segment of Briley Parkway between the intersection with Thompson Lane and Vultee Boulevard just north of US 41/70S opened to traffic in late October 1965. The segment between I-40 and US 70 in the Donelson neighborhood opened to traffic on July 1, 1967. Most of the segment of Briley Parkway between I-65 and I-24 in northeast Nashville was built in the 1960s, but the last section was not completed until March 30, 1978, with the opening of the approximately  segment between I-65 and Gallatin Road. 

In 1983, TDOT took over Briley Parkway. The  segment between SR 12 (Ashland City Highway) and US 431 (Whites Creek Pike) opened on December 15, 1993. Construction of the last section of Briley Pkwy., the  segment between I-24 and I-65, began in November 1995, and opened to traffic on December 19, 1997.

Briley Parkway between US 31E (Ellington Parkway) and I-40 in eastern Nashville was widened from four to eight lanes in multiple projects. The first project, which began in early 1996, widened the route between Two Rivers Parkway and McGavock Pike, and was completed in May 1998. The contract for the stretch located between US 31E (Gallatin Pike) and McGavock Pike was awarded in October 2001. The next phase, between Elm Hill Pike and US 70, was awarded in August 2002, and the next phase, between US 70 and Two Rivers Parkway, was awarded in December 2002. The final phase involved widening the parkway between I-40 and Elm Hill Pike and reconstructing the interchange with I-40, which was completed in December 2006. Initially expected to be complete by June 30, 2005, the widening projects ran into multiple issues, including opposition from nearby residents, issues with right-of-way acquisition, and cost overruns, and were not completed until 2007.

The interchange at I-40 and White Bridge Road was reconstructed in two phases. Phase one was completed ahead of schedule in 2005; phase two, ramps to and from Briley and separating it from the White Bridge Road/I-40 interchange, was completed by 2011.

Major intersections
Counterclockwise (CCW) reads down, clockwise (CW) reads up.

See also
List of Tennessee state highways

References

External links
Tennessee Department of Transportation

155
Transportation in Nashville, Tennessee
Beltways in the United States
Transportation in Davidson County, Tennessee
Briley
Freeways in Tennessee